Oak Lake is a ghost town in section 24 of Audubon Township in Becker County, Minnesota, United States.

History
The village of Oak Lake, which was also known as Oak Lake Cut or Oak City, had a station of the Northern Pacific Railroad located in nearby section 19 of Detroit Township, but was abandoned in 1872 when a new station was built five miles west, in the town of Audubon.

References

Former populated places in Minnesota
Former populated places in Becker County, Minnesota